The 1849 Georgia gubernatorial election was held on October 1, 1849. 

Incumbent Democratic Governor George W. Towns was re-elected to a second term in office. The election was decided by 3,182 votes.

General election

Candidates

Democratic 

 George W. Towns, Incumbent Governor.

Whig 

 Edward Y. Hill

Results

References 

Georgia (U.S. state) gubernatorial elections
Georgia
Gubernatorial